Eucalyptus delegatensis, commonly known as alpine ash, gum-topped stringybark, white-top and in Victoria as woollybutt, is a species of tree that is endemic to southeastern Australia. It has a straight trunk with rough, fibrous to stringy bark on the lower half of the trunk, smooth white bark above, lance-shaped to curved adult leaves, flower buds in groups of between seven and fifteen, white flowers and barrel-shaped or hemispherical fruit.

Description
The bark is rough, grey to black, fibrous or stringy on the lower half of the trunk, smooth white to greyish above. Flowering occurs between December and March and the flowers are white.

Taxonomy and naming
Eucalyptus delegatensis was first formally described in 1900 by Richard Thomas Baker from a specimen collected by William Baeuerlen, (previously known as Wilhelm Bäuerlen) on "Delegate Mountain". The description was published in Proceedings of the Linnean Society of New South Wales. The specific epithet (delegatensis) refers to the type location.

In 1985 Douglas John Boland described two subspecies and the names have been accepted by the Australian Plant Census:
 Eucalyptus delegatensis R.T.Baker subsp. delegatensis that has broadly lance-shaped juvenile leaves and is found in New South Wales and Victoria;
 Eucalyptus delegatensis subsp. tasmaniensis Boland that has more or less round juvenile leaves with a short "drip-tip" and only grows in Tasmania.

Distribution and habitat
Alpine ash is widespread and often dominant in grassy or wet subalpine forest, in deep fertile soil, often on slopes, and commonly forms pure stands. Subspecies tasmaniensis is endemic to Tasmania.

See also
List of Eucalyptus species

References

delegatensis
Myrtales of Australia
Flora of the Australian Capital Territory
Flora of New South Wales
Flora of Tasmania
Flora of Victoria (Australia)
Plants described in 1900
Taxa named by Richard Thomas Baker